The Democratic Alliance was a Bulgarian political party that existed between 1923 and 1934 when all parties were banned. During most of that period (1923-1934) it was the ruling party in the country making it the third longest-ruling party in the country after the Bulgarian Communist Party and the People's Liberal Party.

History 

After the 9 June coup d'état in 1923 its organizers from the Military Union and the People's Alliance tried to create a new party in order to ensure stable political and parliamentary basis for the new government. For that purpose they relied on the member parties of the Constitutional Bloc whose leaders were imprisoned by the government of Aleksandar Stamboliyski.

After the dissolution of the Constitutional Bloc in the end of July and the beginning of August, the Democratic, the Radical Democratic and the United People's Progressive Party created a coalition Union for Democracy. On 10 August it united with the People's Alliance and formed the Democratic Alliance. In the next few months grew the discontent within the Democratic and the Radical Democratic parties caused by the centralization of the organization and its conversion into a single party and in the beginning of 1924 many of their members left the Alliance and reestablished the two parties.

During its whole existence there were three distinct groups. One of them, led by Aleksandar Tsankov was connected with the formed People's Alliance, while the other two, headed by Andrey Lyapchev and Atanas Burov were linked to the traditional parties - the Democratic and the United People's Progressive parties. Those fractions were often in open conflict between one another which threatened the stability of the government several times.

After the loss of the 1931 elections those contradictions became stronger and in the spring of 1932 the fraction of Aleksandar Tsankov left the party. After the ban of the political parties following the 19 May coup d'état in 1934 the Democratic Alliance ceased to exist although some of its leaders remained politically active.

Participation in the government 
 Second government of Aleksandar Tsankov (22 September 1923 — 4 January 1926) - in coalition with the Bulgarian Workers' Social Democratic Party
 First government of Andrey Lyapchev (4 January 1926 — 12 September 1928) - alone
 First government of Andrey Lyapchev (12 September 1928 — 15 May 1930) - alone
 First government of Andrey Lyapchev (15 May 1930 — 29 June 1931) - in coalition with the National Liberal Party

Leaders 
 1923-1926: Aleksandar Tsankov
 1926-1933: Andrey Lyapchev

Sources
Ташев, Ташо. Министрите на България 1879-1999. София, АИ "Проф. Марин Дринов" / Изд. на МО, 1999.  / .

1923 establishments in Bulgaria
1934 disestablishments in Bulgaria
Banned political parties
Defunct political parties in Bulgaria
Political parties disestablished in 1934
Political parties established in 1923